Spyridium waterhousei is a species of flowering plant in the family Rhamnaceae and is endemic to Kangaroo Island in South Australia. It is an erect, slightly sticky shrub with linear leaves and heads of hairy flowers with three brown bracts at the base.

Description
The flowers heads are arranged in cymes usually with up to 3 sessile flowers each with 2 or 3 egg-shaped or lance-shaped brown bracts at the base and felty-hairy floral leaves.

Taxonomy
Spyridium waterhousei was first formally described in 1862 by Ferdinand von Mueller in Fragmenta Phytographiae Australiae, from specimens collected on the "Freestone Range" by Frederick George Waterhouse. The specific epithet (waterhousei) honours the collector of the type specimens.

The species was later included in other genera, including Cryptandra, Solanendra and Stenanthemum, due to confusion surrounding generic limits in the tribe Pomaderreae of the Rhamnaceae.

Distribution and habitat
Spyridium waterhousei is endemic to Kangaroo Island in South Australia where it is known as Cryptandra waterhousii, and grows in sugar gum (Eucalyptus cladocalyx) woodland, often along creeklines.

References

waterhousei
Rosales of Australia
Flora of South Australia
Plants described in 1862
Taxa named by Ferdinand von Mueller